Natset is a major village on the Chindwin River in Paungbyin Township, Mawlaik District, in the Sagaing Region of northwestern Burma. It is located on the border of Homalin Township, southwest of Myene.

References

External links
Maplandia World Gazetteer

Populated places in Mawlaik District